The third season of Tawag ng Tanghalan is an amateur singing competition currently aired as a segment of the noontime show It's Showtime that premiered on June 25, 2018.

These are the finalists that competed in the competition.

Grand Finalists

Elaine Duran 

Elaine Duran is a mass communication graduate from Butuan. She is the 4th contender to enter the semifinals and eventually became the first Hall of Famer after achieving 10 straight wins. She participated in the Quarter I Semifinals, garnering the highest combined score from the judges and the public of 97.57%.

Ranillo Enriquez 
Ranillo Enriquez is a contender from Visayas. He is the 5th semifinalist contender to enter the semifinals. Days after qualifying to the semifinals, he participated in the Quarter I Semifinals, garnering the second highest combined score from the judges and the public of 57.77%

John Michael Dela Cerna 
John Michael dela Cerna is a contender from Mindanao. He is the 6th contender to enter the second semifinals and the 11th overall semifinalist. He participated in the Quarter II Semifinals, garnering the highest combined score from the judges and the public of 98.40%

John Mark Saga 
John Mark Saga is a contender from Luzon. He is the 4th contender to enter the second semifinals and the 9th overall semifinalist. Previously, he was the first semifinalist of Season 2, but lost in the semifinals and did not participate in the Ultimate Resbak round of that season. He is the second contender to enter the hall of fame. He participated in the Quarter II Semifinals, garnering the 2nd highest combined score from the judges and the public of 70.09%

Charizze Arnigo

Jonas Oñate

Violeta Bayawa

Julius Cawaling

Shaina Mae Allaga

Rafaello Cañedo

Jermaine Apil 
Jermaine Apil is a contender from Luzon. She is the 3rd contender to enter the 4th semifinals and the 19th semifinalist overall. She participated in the Quarter IV Semifinals, but placing 4th in the ranking with only 49.02%. She participated in the Ultimate Resbak, eventually being declared as one of the grand finalist after knocking Ferlyn Suela in the seats of power.

Mariko Ledesma 
Mariko Ledesma is a contender from Luzon. She is the last contender to enter the Instant Resbak Week, being saved by Jolina Magdangal. Previously, she competed on Pilipinas Got Talent, Asia's Got Talent, and Britain's Got Talent under the group Miss Tres. She participated in the Instant Resbak round but lost the daily rounds. Eventually, she was saved by Billy Crawford to participate in the Ultimate Resbak. She advanced to the Grand Finals after maintaining her place in the Seat of Power.

Kim Nemenzo

Final Resbakers

Ultimate Resbakers

Instant Resbakers

Semifinalists

References

Tawag ng Tanghalan seasons
2018 Philippine television seasons